Tory Rocca (born 1973) is an American lawyer and former politician who represented the 10th district of the Michigan Senate from 2011 until 2018.

Early life 
In 1973, Rocca was born in Sterling Heights, Michigan. Rocca's father is Sal Rocca and his step-mother is Sue Rocca. Rocca's parents both are politicians in Michigan and previously served in the Michigan House of Representatives.

Education 
Rocca earned a bachelor's degree from University of Michigan. In 1995, Rocca earned an MBA degree from University of Michigan. In 1999, Rocca earned a JD from University of Michigan Law School.

Career 
In the 1970s, at about 5 years old, Rocca became involved in politics, where he volunteered in political campaigns.

Rocca was a lab technician for Johnson Controls.

In 2000, Rocca passed the Michigan Bar. Rocca practiced business law and product liability law.

In November 2004, Rocca was elected as member of the Michigan State House of Representatives for District 30.

In November 2010, Rocca was elected as member of Michigan State Senate for District 10.

Rocca was the chairman of the Regulatory Reform Committee in the Senate and he was the vice-chair of the Joint Committee on Administrative Rules.

As of June 2018, due to term limits, Rocca will not be able to run for another term. In November 2018, Rocca's District 10 seat was won by Michael MacDonald.

See also 
 2004 Michigan House of Representatives election
 2014 Michigan Senate election

References

External links 
 Tory Rocca at ballotpedia.org
 Tory Rocca at michiganvotes.org

1973 births
Living people
Michigan lawyers
Republican Party Michigan state senators
Republican Party members of the Michigan House of Representatives
People from Sterling Heights, Michigan
University of Michigan Law School alumni
21st-century American politicians
American people of Italian descent